Gage Parker Canning (born April 23, 1997) is an American professional baseball outfielder who is a free agent.

Originally from Ramona, California, Canning attended Arizona State University and played college baseball for the Arizona State Sun Devils. As a junior, Canning led the NCAA in triples with 11. He was drafted by the Nationals in the fifth round of the 2018 Major League Baseball draft and chose to turn pro. He made his professional debut with the Auburn Doubledays of the New York–Penn League, the Nationals' Class A Short Season affiliate; in one of his first games with the Doubledays on June 22, 2018, he came a double shy of hitting for the cycle. In July 2018, he was promoted to the Nationals' Class A Full Season affiliate, the Hagerstown Suns of the South Atlantic League.

As an outfielder, Canning was ranked as the Nationals' thirteenth-best prospect in July 2018 by MLB Pipeline.

Canning stands , and while he bats from the left side, he throws right-handed. After he was drafted by the Nationals, team scouting director Kris Kline compared him to Nationals outfielder Adam Eaton, describing him as a "classic over-achiever" and predicting he will play in the major leagues. Speed is a key part of his game.

He was released by the Nationals in July 2022.

References

External links

1997 births
Living people
Arizona State Sun Devils baseball players
Auburn Doubledays players
Hagerstown Suns players
Potomac Nationals players
Wilmington Blue Rocks players
Harrisburg Senators players
Lakeshore Chinooks players